William Beard is the name of:

William Beard (bone collector) (1772–1868), British bone collector, the son of a farmer at Banwell, Somerset
William Beard (cricketer), New Zealand cricketer
William E. Beard (1873–1950), American college football player, soldier, journalist and naval historian
William Holbrook Beard (1824–1900), American painter
William P. "Bull Moose" Beard, publisher of the short-lived Abbeville Scimitar